The Panasonic Lumix G X Vario PZ 14-42mm is a zoom lens in the Micro Four Thirds system.  It is a "standard zoom"- ranging from moderately wide to moderately tele.  An unusual feature is that the lens collapses to pancake size.  To do so, focus-by-wire and power zoom are manually controlled by two thumb levers, not grip rings.  There is no hardware switch for O.I.S, instead being controlled via the camera body.  Panasonic's "HD" branding indicates focus and zoom motors are quiet, for videography.  The optics contain Panasonic's "nano surface coating".

External links
 https://web.archive.org/web/20110929144405/http://panasonic.net/avc/lumix/systemcamera/gms/lens/g_x_vario_14_42.html

14-042
Camera lenses introduced in 2011